Zharrëz oil field is an Albanian oil field that was discovered in 1977. It is situated near the village Zharrëz, east of the city Fier. It is one of the biggest on-shore oil fields of Albania. It began production in 1978 and produces oil.

See also

Oil fields of Albania

References

Oil fields of Albania
Patos (municipality)